The  is one of the major newspapers in Japan, published by 

In addition to the Mainichi Shimbun, which is printed twice a day in several local editions, Mainichi also operates an English language news website called The Mainichi (previously Mainichi Daily News), and publishes a bilingual news magazine, Mainichi Weekly. It also publishes paperbacks, books and other magazines, including a weekly news magazine, Sunday Mainichi.

It is one of the four national newspapers in Japan; the other three are the Asahi Shimbun, the Yomiuri Shimbun and the Nihon Keizai Shimbun. The Sankei Shimbun and The Chunichi Shimbun are not currently in the position of a national newspaper despite a large circulation for the both respectively.

History
The history of the Mainichi Shinbun began with the founding of two papers during the Meiji period. The Tokyo Nichi Nichi Shimbun was founded first, in 1872. The Mainichi claims that it is the oldest existing Japanese daily newspaper with its 136-year history. The Osaka Mainichi Shimbun was founded four years later, in 1876. The two papers merged in 1911, but the two companies continued to print their newspapers independently until 1943, when both editions were placed under a Mainichi Shimbun masthead. In 1966, the Tokyo office was moved from Yurakucho to Takebashi, and in 1992, the Osaka office was moved from Dojima to Nishi-Umeda.

The Mainichi has 3,200 employees working in 364 offices in Japan and 26 bureaus overseas. It is one of Japan's three largest newspapers in terms of circulation and number of employees, and has 79 associated companies, including Tokyo Broadcasting System (TBS), Mainichi Broadcasting System (MBS) and the Sports Nippon Newspaper. (despite affiliation, the Mainichi does not own the largest stock in TBS nor in MBS)

The Mainichi is the only Japanese newspaper company to have won a Pulitzer Prize, for the 1960 photograph "Tokyo Stabbing". The Japan Newspapers Association, made up of 180 news organizations, has granted the Mainichi its Grand Prix award on 21 occasions, making the Mainichi the most frequent winner of the prize since its inception in 1957.

Partnership with MSN
On 15 January 2004, Mainichi Shimbun and MSN Japan announced they were to merge their websites. On 18 September 2007, Mainichi announced the launch of their new website, mainichi.jp, which would include "heavy use of social bookmarking, RSS and blog parts" and would "pay attention to bloggers". The new website began operations on 1 October 2007, marking the end of MSN-Mainichi Interactive, being replaced by mainichi.jp. The English-language Mainichi Daily News also moved to the new website. MSN-Japan switched to Sankei Shinbun.

WaiWai controversy and cancellation 
The Mainichi Daily News column WaiWai, by Australian journalist Ryann Connell, featured often-sensationalist stories, principally translated from and based on articles appearing in Japanese tabloids. The column carried a disclaimer since September 19, 2002: "WaiWai stories are transcriptions of articles that originally appeared in Japanese language publications. The Mainichi Daily News cannot be held responsible for the content of the original articles, nor does it guarantee their accuracy. Views expressed in the WaiWai column are not necessarily those held by the Mainichi Daily News or the Mainichi Newspapers Co." Nevertheless, WaiWai content was reported as fact in blogs and reputable foreign media sources.

In April and May 2008, an aggressive anti-WaiWai campaign appeared on internet forums including 2channel. Criticism included "contents are too vulgar" and "the stories could cause Japanese people to be misunderstood abroad." Critics had accused the WaiWai column of propagating a racist stereotype of Japanese women as sexual deviants with its sensationalist stories about incest, bestiality and debauchery. On June 20, a news site J-CAST reported on this issue. The Mainichi editorial board responded by deleting controversial WaiWai articles and limiting archive access, but the column remained in the Sunday Mainichi. Citing continuing criticism, Mainichi's Digital Media Division shut down WaiWai on June 21.  Mainichi also announced it would "severely punish the head of the Digital Media Division, which is responsible for overseeing the site, the manager responsible for the column and the editor involved with the stories." On June 25, Mainichi apologized to MDN readers. Some advertisers responded to the campaign by pulling ads from Mainichi's Japanese site.

On June 28, 2008, Mainichi announced punitive measures. Connell, who remained anonymous in the announcement, was suspended for three months ("issuing three months' disciplinary leave"). Other involved personnel were either docked 10%–20% salary or "stripped of their titles" for a period of one or two months.

On July 20, 2008, Mainichi released the results of an in-house investigation. Mainichi announced that it would re-organize the MDN Editorial Department on August 1 with a new chief editor, and would re-launch the MDN on September 1 as a more news-oriented site. Mainichi said, "We continued to post articles that contained incorrect information about Japan and indecent sexual content. These articles, many of which were not checked, should not have been dispatched to Japan or the world. We apologize deeply for causing many people trouble and for betraying the public's trust in the Mainichi Shinbun."

Offices

, corporate headquarters
1-1-1, Hitotsubashi, Chiyoda, Tokyo

3-4-5, Umeda, Kita-ku, Osaka

Midland Square, 4-7-1, Meieki, Nakamura-ku, Nagoya

13-1, Konya-machi, Kokura Kita-ku, Kitakyushu
1314 W. McDermott Dr, Allen (Dallas) Texas USA (Central Region)

Sponsorship

Like other Japanese newspaper companies, Mainichi hosts many cultural events such as art exhibitions and sporting events. Among them, the most famous are the Senbatsu High School baseball tournament held every spring at Koshien Stadium, and the non-professional baseball tournaments held every summer in the Tokyo Dome (formerly held in Korakuen Stadium) and the end of the fall in the Osaka Dome.

The company sponsors a number of prominent annual road running competitions in Japan, including the Lake Biwa Marathon and the Beppu-Ōita Marathon.

See also

Mainichi Kāsan (Daily Momma)
Media of Japan
Mainichi Film Awards

References

Further reading

External links

The Mainichi in English

Daily newspapers published in Japan
English-language newspapers published in Japan
Mass media companies based in Tokyo
Publications established in 1872
Centrist newspapers
Centre-left newspapers
Liberal media in Japan
1872 establishments in Japan
Japanese-language newspapers